Labyrinth Bay is an Arctic waterway in Kitikmeot Region, Nunavut, Canada. It is located in southwestern Queen Maud Gulf off Nunavut's mainland.

Described by Arctic explorer Vilhjalmur Stefansson as being dotted with numerous islands, southward from the bay lies a range of rocky hills.

Foggy Bay and Conolly Bayare nearby.

References

Bays of Kitikmeot Region